Heminautilus is an extinct genus of nautiloids from the nautilacean family Cenoceratidae that lived during the Early Cretaceous. Fossils of Heminautilus have been registered in rocks of Barremian and Aptian age. Nautiloids are a subclass of shelled cephalopods that were once diverse and numerous but are now represented by only a handful of species.

Heminautilus has a discoidal compressed involute shell with flanks converging on a narrow flattened outer margin, the venter. Whorls are higher than they are wide. The suture is sinuous with a ventral lobe, subtriangular saddles on the ventral shoulders, broad lateral lobes, and narrow rounded saddles on the umbilical shoulders. The siphuncle is subcentral.

Species 
The following species of Heminautilus have been described:
 H. boselliorum
 H. etheringtoni
 H. japonicus
 H. lallierianus
 H. rangei
 H. sanctaecrucis
 H. saxbii
 H. stantoni
 H. tejeriensis
 H. tyosiensis
 H. verneuilli

Distribution 
Fossils of Heminautilus have been found in Bulgaria, Colombia (at Caballos Formation, Boyacá, Tolima and Une Formation), Egypt, France, Hungary, Japan, Mexico, Spain, Switzerland, Tunesia, the United Kingdom, the United States (Arkansas), Venezuela.

See also 

 List of nautiloids

References

Bibliography

Further reading 
 

Prehistoric nautiloid genera
Cretaceous animals of Asia
Cretaceous molluscs of Europe
Cretaceous animals of North America
Cretaceous Mexico
Cretaceous United States
Cretaceous animals of South America
Cretaceous Colombia
Fossils of Colombia
Aptian life
Early Cretaceous genus first appearances
Early Cretaceous genus extinctions
Fossil taxa described in 1927